HMS Solitaire may refer to:

This list may be incomplete.
 French ship Solitaire (1774) was captured by the Royal Navy in 1784 and renamed HMS Solitaire. She was sold out of the navy in 1790.
 HMS Solitaire (1904) was a tug which capsized and sank in 1944.

Royal Navy ship names